Brih, Breeh is a village in the Chouf District in Mount Lebanon region, Lebanon.

The word Brih, is of Syro-Aramaic origin it means "The House of the Perfume" where "Bet" which means house or place and "Rih" or "Reeha" means perfume.

Access to Brih
There are three roads leading to Brih:

 Road from East of Lebanon : Beqaa – Maaser El Chouf – Moukhtara – Boqaata – Ain w Zain – Batloun – Kfar Nabrakh – Brih.
 Road from North of Lebanon : Beirut – Aley – Bhamdoun – Saoufar – Mdayrij – Ain Dara – Nabeh Safa – Brih.
 Road from South of Lebanon : Damour – Deir el Qamar – Maaser Beit Eddin – Fouwara – Brih.

Population 
Brih is a mixed Druze and Christian village.

St George's Church attack 
Druze leftist gunmen attacked St George's Church during prayers on August 21, 1977 with automatic gunfire inside and around the church killing 13 people.

Religious places in Brih
 The Druze House, or the Village House.
 Saint Georges is a Maronite
 Saint Elias, another Maronite Church

References

External links
Brih,  Localiban 

Populated places in Chouf District